Gunter Van Handenhoven (born 16 December 1978) is a Belgian former professional footballer and former team manager of R.S.C. Anderlecht. Since 18 October 2021 he is the assistant-coach of K.V. Kortrijk.

Club career
Van Handenhoven was born in Sint-Niklaas. He made an early breakthrough in Belgian first division and soon he was transferred to FC Metz. But he came back in the Belgian championship in 2002. In 2008, he returned to the Belgian first division to play for Roeselare.

International career
Van Handenhoven played for Belgium U-21. He played at the 1997 FIFA World Youth Championship.

Personal life
He was for four years married to model Ann Van Elsen, with whom he has daughter June, and is the brother of Sandrine Van Handenhoven, a singer, who ended fourth in Idool 2004.

References

Living people
1978 births
Sportspeople from Sint-Niklaas
Footballers from East Flanders
Association football wingers
Belgian footballers
Belgium youth international footballers
Belgium under-21 international footballers
FC Metz players
K.A.A. Gent players
K.S.C. Lokeren Oost-Vlaanderen players
R.A.A. Louviéroise players
Al Ahli SC (Doha) players
K.S.V. Roeselare players
Belgian Pro League players
Ligue 1 players
Ligue 2 players
Qatari Second Division players
Belgian expatriate footballers
Expatriate footballers in France
Expatriate footballers in Qatar